Trialeti is a daba in Tsalka Municipality in the Kvemo Kartli region of Georgia. The daba has a population of 615, as of 2020, up from 565 in 2014.

References 

Populated places in Kvemo Kartli